Lorenzo Servitje Sendra, (November 20, 1918 – February 3, 2017) was a Mexican accountant and businessman, who co-founded Grupo Bimbo, the world's largest bakery company, in 1945 with four partners, Jaime Jorba, Jaime Sendra, Alfonso Velasco and José T. Mata.

Biography
Servitje was born in Mexico City on November 20, 1918. His father, Joan Servitje, a baker by profession, and his mother, Josefina Sendra, had immigrated to Mexico from Catalonia in Spain. His granddaughter is the actress Marina de Tavira, who appeared in the film Roma.
 
Servitje is credited with expanding Bimbo from a small, Mexican baking company into a multinational conglomerate that has acquired more than 100 domestic and international brands, including Thomas', Entenmann's, Stroehmann, Oroweat and Freihofer's. Servitje was Bimbo's president from 1945 to 1981, and remained chairman until 1994.

He co-founded Bimbo in 1945 with ten delivery vans and thirty-eight employees. By 2017, Bimbo owned 100 brands in 22 countries. The company reported $10.7 billion in sales in 2015.

Death
Lorenzo Servitje died in Mexico City on February 3, 2017, at the age of 98. He was predeceased by his wife, Carmen Montull Valles, who died in 2002, and survived by eight children, 24 grandchildren and 48 great-grandchildren.

His son, Daniel Servitje, is now the chairman and CEO of Grupo Bimbo.

Dignitaries in attendance at Servitje's funeral included Mexican President Enrique Peña Nieto, chairman of Grupo Carso Carlos Slim, and billionaire businessman Alberto Baillères.

References

Mexican chief executives
Mexican business executives
Mexican investors
Mexican company founders
Food and drink company founders
Mexican people of Catalan descent
Mexican people of Spanish descent
Businesspeople from Mexico City
1918 births
2017 deaths
20th-century Mexican businesspeople
21st-century Mexican businesspeople
Grupo Bimbo people